Eduardo VII Park is a public park in Lisbon, Portugal.

The park is named for King Edward VII of the United Kingdom, who visited Portugal in 1903 to strengthen relations between the two countries and reaffirm the Anglo-Portuguese Alliance. Until Edward's visit the park was called Parque da Liberdade (Liberty Park). In 1945 Portuguese Modernist architect Francisco Keil do Amaral redesigned the park to its current configuration.

The Carlos Lopes Pavilion, the former Portuguese pavilion at the 1922 Rio de Janeiro International Exposition, and the Estufa Fria—a  greenhouse garden—are situated within the park. The largest Portuguese flag in the world is usually flown at the park's northern end.

The Lisbon Book Fair is held annually in Eduardo VII Park.

The song "Pehle Pehle Pyar ki Mulakate" from the Indian Movie The Great Gambler was shot here.

References

Parks in Lisbon
Edward VII